Mesida culta, is a species of spider of the genus Mesida. It is native to India and Sri Lanka.

See also 
 List of Tetragnathidae species

References

Tetragnathidae
Spiders of Asia
Spiders described in 1869